Caladenia longicauda subsp. eminens, commonly known as the stark white spider orchid, is a plant in the orchid family Orchidaceae and is endemic to the south-west of Western Australia. It has a single hairy leaf and up to three large, bright white flowers with long, broad, spreading lateral sepals and petals, a relatively broad labellum with short, narrow teeth. It is a relatively common orchid found in a broad band, mainly between Tenterden and Jerramungup.

Description
There are four or more rows of pale red calli in the centre of the labellum. Flowering occurs from August to early October.

Taxonomy and naming
Caladenia longicauda was first formally described by John Lindley in 1840 and the description was published in A Sketch of the Vegetation of the Swan River Colony. In 2001 Stephen Hopper and Andrew Brown described eleven subspecies, including subspecies eminens and the descriptions were published in Nuytsia. The subspecies name (eminens) is a Latin word meaning “prominent", or "illustrious" referring to the attractiveness of the flowers of this subspecies.

Distribution and habitat
The stark white spider orchid mainly occurs between Tenterden and Jerramungup but is also found as far east as Esperance and as far north as Moora,  in the  Avon Wheatbelt, Coolgardie, Esperance Plains, Jarrah Forest, Mallee and Swan Coastal Plain biogeographic regions where it grows in wandoo (Eucalyptus wandoo) and yate (Eucalyptus cornuta) woodland.

Conservation
Caladenia longicauda subsp. eminens  is classified as "not threatened" by the Western Australian Government Department of Parks and Wildlife.

References

longicauda subsp. eminens
Endemic orchids of Australia
Orchids of Western Australia
Plants described in 2001
Taxa named by Stephen Hopper
Taxa named by Andrew Phillip Brown